François Ricard (4 June 1947 – 17 February 2022) was a Canadian writer and academic from Quebec. He was a professor of French literature at McGill University since 1980, including a special but not exclusive focus on the work of Milan Kundera and Gabrielle Roy, and has published numerous works of non-fiction.

Biography
Born and raised in Shawinigan, Ricard was educated at McGill University and the University of Provence.

He was a founder of the literary journal Liberté, has served on the editorial boards of the publishing houses Éditions Sentier and Éditions du Boréal, and has contributed to both Radio-Canada and Télé-Québec as a literature reviewer and a host of documentary programming on Quebec literature and history.

Ricard died in Montreal on 17 February 2022, at the age of 74.

Awards
He won the Governor General's Award for French-language non-fiction at the 1985 Governor General's Awards for La littérature contre elle-même, and Gabrielle Roy: A Life, an English translation by Patricia Claxton of his 1996 book Gabrielle Roy, une vie, won the 1999 Drainie-Taylor Biography Prize and the Governor General's Award for French to English translation at the 1999 Governor General's Awards.
The original French edition of Gabrielle Roy, une vie was a shortlisted nominee for the Governor General's Award at the 1997 Governor General's Awards, and Le dernier après-midi d’Agnès: essai sur l’oeuvre de Milan Kundera was nominated at the 2003 Governor General's Awards.

Works
 L'art de Félix-Antoine Savard dans « Menaud, maître-draveur », 1972
 Gabrielle Roy, 1972
 Une liaison parisienne, 1980
 Le Prince et la Ténèbre, 1980
 L'Incroyable odyssée, 1981
 La Littérature contre elle-même, 1985
 Guide de la littérature québécoise, 1988
 La Chasse-galerie et autres récits, 1989
 La Génération lyrique, 1992
 English translation The Lyric Generation, 1994
 René Richard : 1895-1982, 1993
 Gabrielle Roy : une vie, 1996
 English translation Gabrielle Roy: A Life, 1999
 Le Temps qui m'a manqué, 1997
 Le Pays de Bonheur d'occasion et autres récits autobiographiques épars et inédits
 Introduction à l'œuvre de Gabrielle Roy : 1945-1975, 2001
 (éd.) Gabrielle Roy, Mon cher grand fou, 2001
 Le Dernier Après-midi d'Agnès : essai sur l'œuvre de Milan Kundera, 2003
 Chroniques d'un temps loufoque, 2005
Moeurs de province, 2014

References

External links
François Ricard at Les Éditions du Boréal

1947 births
2022 deaths
20th-century biographers
20th-century Canadian essayists
20th-century Canadian male writers
21st-century biographers
21st-century Canadian essayists
21st-century Canadian male writers
21st-century Canadian poets
French Quebecers
Canadian biographers
Male biographers
Canadian non-fiction writers in French
Writers from Quebec
People from Shawinigan
Academic staff of McGill University
Canadian male poets
Canadian male essayists
McGill University alumni
Governor General's Award-winning non-fiction writers